Ornithocephalus ciliatus is a species of orchid found from Trinidad, the Guianas, Venezuela, Ecuador, Peru and Brazil.

References

External links 

ciliatus
Orchids of South America
Orchids of Trinidad
Plants described in 1840